Christine Fernandes Alves (born 1 March 1968) is an American-born Brazilian actress, television presenter and former model.

Early life 
Christine was born in Chicago, Illinois, daughter of Maria Helena and Antônio, Brazilian parents. She was born and lived until the age of 3 in the United States, then her family returned to Brazil, to the city of Rio de Janeiro.

From thirteen to sixteen she was a volleyball player. Soon after she began modeling. At 17 she moved back to the United States to attend High School in California. When she turned 18, she moved to Japan and lived in Tokyo for 2 years working as a photographic model.

Career

Model 
In 1984, at the age of 16, she was approached by a professional from a fashion agency who invited her to take a pathogenic test, becoming a model in that year.  The following year he moved to the United States to model and in the country, he finished high school and joined the faculty of journalism, which did not finish.

In 1992, she moved to Japan, where she modeled for two more years before deciding to return to Brazil to study theater at Globo's Actors Workshop in 1994.

Actress 
After a test for the Actors Workshop of Rede Globo, was cast in his first TV appearance, an interest in the novel Quatro por Quatro (1995), of Carlos Lombardi. The following year, Manoel Carlos bet the young actress and gave her a prominent role in História de Amor. Among other works, Christine attended Perdidos de Amor, a novel independent Rede Bandeirantes, but soon returned and appeared in the Rede Globo productions as Chiquinha Gonzaga (1999) and Esplendor (2000), in which she met the actor Marcelo Serrado, with whom she was married from 1994 to 1999. She made her first appearance on film in Slapstick and O Trapalhão e a Luz Azul (1999), Paulo Aragão Neto and Alexandre Boury.

After 4 years without integrating the fixed cast of a telenovela in the Globo, Christine signed with RecordTV in 2005 and debuted its first great protagonist, Aurélia in Essas Mulheres, character based on the book Senhora, of José de Alencar. By Aurélia, actress was praised by the specialized critic, noting its maturation in scene when facing a deep and of great complexity character, being his work of greater recognition in the race. In 2006, due to the repercussion of her previous novel, Rede Globo called Christine back to one of the central characters of Páginas da Vida. In 2007 Christine was in the cast of the play Hedda Glaber. Christine joined the cast of the soap opera A Favorita in 2008. The actress in 2009, joined the cast of soap opera Viver a Vida of Rede Globo.

In 2010 Christine joined the cast of the seventh season of Dança dos Famosos, under the Domingão do Faustão. In 2011 she presented the program Saia Justa, in the GNT, along with Dan Stulbach, Eduardo Moscovis, Mônica Waldvogel, Teté Ribeiro, Xico Sá and Léo Jaime, but left the program because of personal problems and was replaced by actress Camila Morgado.

In 2012 she was in the episode A Fofoqueira de Porto Alegre in series As Brasileiras and made participation in the novels Avenida Brasil of  João Emanuel Carneiro, in which he played Mônica and Cheias de Charme, in which he played the American journalist Scarlet. In the same year returns to cinemas with the film De Pernas pro Ar 2.

In 2016, after seven years without being escalated to a novel, Christine decides not to renew contract with Globo aiming at new challenges in the race. In 2017 he signed with RecordTV and played the first major antagonist of his career, Sammu-Ramat in O Rico e Lázaro.

After  O Rico e Lázaro on RecordTV, Christine returns to Rede Globo in the novel Orgulho e Paixão. In the plot, interprets Josephine, wife of Almirante Tibúrcio, lived by Oscar Magrini.

Personal life 

In 1994, she married actor Marcelo Serrado, with whom she remained until 1999.

She was married to actor Floriano Peixoto, with whom she has a son, Pedro, born in July 2003. The two separated in early 2018.

Filmography

Television

Films

Theater

References

External links

 
 Personal Blog

1968 births
Living people
Actresses from Chicago
American people of Brazilian descent
Female models from Illinois
American emigrants to Brazil
Actresses from Rio de Janeiro (city)
Brazilian female models
Brazilian telenovela actresses
Brazilian stage actresses
20th-century Brazilian actresses
21st-century Brazilian actresses